Powakka is an indigenous village of Lokono Amerindians in the resort of Oost in the Para District in Suriname. The village is located on the road to Carolina which connects to the Afobakaweg to Paramaribo.

Overview
Powakka is located in a savanna area. The economy is mainly based on production of pineapples, Tourism has become important as well, and several tourist resorts are located in Powakka. An animal husbandry project was started in the 1930s, however it only yielded limited success.

The Catholic mission had been active in the village since the late 18th century. The village has a school and a clinic. On 15 December 2020, Sergio Sabajo was elected as the village chief.

References

Bibliography
 

Indigenous villages in Suriname
Populated places in Para District